84th Regiment of Foot refers to one of three infantry regiments that served in the British Empire:
 84th Regiment of Foot (1759) (1759–1765), served entirely in India, no successors
 84th Regiment of Foot (Royal Highland Emigrants) (1775–1784), served in the American Revolution
 84th (York and Lancaster) Regiment of Foot (1793–1881), served in the Napoleonic Wars and in India, incorporated into York and Lancaster Regiment